Cecil Morgan Sr. (August 20, 1898 – June 14, 1999) was an American politician in the state of Louisiana who served in the Louisiana House of Representatives and Louisiana State Senate.

References

American centenarians
Men centenarians
1898 births
1999 deaths
Members of the Louisiana House of Representatives
Louisiana state senators
Louisiana State University Law Center alumni
Tulane University Law School faculty
20th-century American politicians